RCL may refer to:

 Radial collateral ligament, one of three ligaments in the upper limb on the side of the radius bone:
 Radial collateral ligament of elbow joint
 Radial collateral ligament of thumb
 Radial collateral ligament of wrist joint
 Ramped Cargo Lighter, Canadian built landing craft of WW2
 Ramped Craft Logistic, Landing craft operated by the Royal Logistic Corps of the British Army
 Ramsey County Library, Minnesota, United States
 RC Lens (Racing Club de Lens), a French Ligue 2 football team
 Recoilless rifle
 Reliance Capital Limited, an Indian financial services company
 Revised Common Lectionary,in Christianity, a set of readings
 Revolutionary Communist League (disambiguation), various political parties
 RLC circuit, an electrical circuit with resistor, inductor, and capacitor, sometimes referred to as an RCL circuit
Robot Combat League, TV show of robot fighting competitions
 Royal Canadian Legion, an ex-servicemen's organisation
 Royal Caribbean Group (NYSE ticker code RCL), a holding company owning cruise lines
 Rugby Club Luxembourg, a rugby union club in Luxembourg City